Mamitha Baiju is an Indian actress works primarily in Malayalam films. She made her debut in 2017 through Sarvopari Palakkaran. She rose into fame playing the roles of Alphonsa in Operation Java (2021), Anju in Kho Kho (2021) and Sona in Super Sharanya (2022).

Early life
Mamita Baiju hails from Kidangoor in Kottayam district of Kerala. Her parents are Dr. K. Baiju and Mini Baiju. She has an elder brother, Midhun. 

Mamitha did her schooling at Mary Mount Public School, Kattachira, and at N.S.S. Higher Secondary School, Kidangoor. She is currently pursuing B. Sc in Psychology from Sacred Heart College in Kochi.

Filmography

 All films are in Malayalam unless noted otherwise.

Awards and nominations

References

External links

Mamitha Baiju at MSI

Year of birth missing (living people)
Place of birth missing (living people)
Living people
People from Kerala
Indian film actresses
Actresses in Malayalam cinema
Actresses in Tamil cinema
20th-century Indian actresses
21st-century Indian actresses